Peralta Elementary School is a designated arts anchor school in the Oakland Unified School District. It was established in 1880 as a one-room schoolhouse, and today has around 325 students in 14 classrooms (K–5th).

The school has a tradition of family involvement and activism that stretches back to the 19th century.

In 2006, Peralta was one of six schools in California where African-American students scored an API that exceeded 800 on the state STAR test. In 2008, Peralta demonstrated that academic targets were achieved for all subgroups at the school.

Since the early 1990s the Peralta staff, students, families and neighbors have been working to make the school a green oasis. Tons of asphalt have been removed and replaced with edible gardens, a small amphitheater, a new kindergarten play area, and a California natives garden. The gardens are teaching too, helping students to learn about healthy eating, science, and stewardship of the land. Families help maintain the gardens during monthly work days, which build community and give students a feeling of ownership and responsibility for their school. Peralta's gardens have been held up as local and regional models.

Peralta is a community hub, with events and activities such as a community yardsale, walkathon and spring festival called Peralta in Bloom.

References

External links
 Peralta Elementary School

Education in Oakland, California
Public elementary schools in California
Schools in Alameda County, California
Educational institutions established in 1880
1880 establishments in California
Oakland Unified School District